Bilär (Tatar: Биләр) - was a medieval city in Volga Bulgaria and its second capital before the Mongol invasion of Volga Bulgaria. It was located on the left bank of the Small Cheremshan River in  Alexeeyevsky District of the Tatarstan. The distance to Bilyarsk is 50 km and 150 km to Kazan.

History 
The city was founded around 10th century by the indigenous Bilär tribe of the Volga Bulgars. In the Rus chronicles, it was also known as "Great City" (Великий город), because its population reputedly was in excess of 100,000.  Bilyar was one of the main trade centers in the Middle Volga, and alternatively with the Bulgar city and Nur-Suvar served as the capital of Volga Bulgaria in the 12th and 13th centuries. In 1236, the city was sacked by the army of Batu Khan. The city was later rebuilt, but it never regained its former size or power. The city's ruins (nearly 8 km2) were explored by Rychkov, Tatischev, Khalikov and Khuchin.

Near old Bilyar in 1654 was founded a Russian border fort Bilyarsk, which today is an ethnic Russian village. In 1930-1963 Bilyarsk was an administrative center of Bilyar District. By the 2000 census, its population was 2,270. It is a birthplace of chemist Alexander Arbuzov.

Bilyar was the capital of the Volga-Kama-Bulgaria from the 10th century until the early 13th century. It was also one of the largest cities of medieval Eurasia. The end of the city in 1236 also resulted in the loss of its monumental architecture.

Bilyar Point
Bilyar Point on Livingston Island in the South Shetland Islands, Antarctica is named after Bilär.

In popular culture

Bilyarsk was the home of a fictional Soviet air force base in Craig Thomas' Firefox novel and subsequent film, about the fictional MiG-31 Firefox aircraft stolen by United States Air Force pilot Mitchell Gant.

Gallery

See also

 Volga Bulgaria
 Bulgaria
 Bulgars
 Great Bulgaria
 Mount Imeon
 Bahlikas
 Mongol invasion
Invasion of Volga Bulgaria

References

Resources 

 Fayaz Sharipovich Huzin | BILYAR - BULGARIAN GREAT CITY  (Publisher "Zaman" Republic of Tatarstan). Russian (Хузин Фаяз Шариповичь | Биляр - Великий Город Болгарский (Издательство «Заман» Республика Татарстан))

External links
The Site of Bilyar
Where the Volga Bulgaria has disappeared?
50th Anniversary of Bilyar Archaeological Expedition: results and issues of Great Town investigation

History of Tatarstan
Volga Bulgaria
Defunct towns in Russia
Archaeological sites in Tatarstan
Former populated places in Russia
Cultural heritage monuments of federal significance in Tatarstan